Tucker Lake is a lake in Alberta, Canada.

Origin 
The origin of the name "Tucker" is not known. Locally, the lake is called Little Jackfish Lake, probably because of the abundant but small northern pike that inhabit its waters.

See also 
List of lakes of Alberta

References 

Municipal District of Bonnyville No. 87
Tucker Lake